Calvin Christian School may refer to:
Calvin Christian School (Kingston, Tasmania)
Calvin Christian School (Escondido, California)